Saladin Martin (born January 17, 1956) is a former American football player.

Early years
Martin prepped at Lincoln High in Southeast San Diego.

College career
Martin played college football at San Diego State University.

Professional career
Martin played in the National Football League for the New York Jets and San Francisco 49ers in 1980 and 1981. He earned one Super Bowl Ring in 1981 with the San Francisco 49ers in Super Bowl XVI

References

1956 births
Living people
San Francisco 49ers players
San Diego State Aztecs football players
Players of American football from San Diego
American football defensive backs
New York Jets players